The Revolutionary Government Junta (JRG) was the name of three consecutive joint civilian-military dictatorships that ruled El Salvador between 15 October 1979 and 2 May 1982.

The first junta, from 1979 to 1980, consisted of two colonels, Adolfo Arnoldo Majano Ramos and Jaime Abdul Gutiérrez Avendaño, and three civilians, Guillermo Manuel Ungo, Mario Antonio Andino and Román Mayorga Quirós. The second junta, from January through December 1980, consisted of Majano Ramos and Gutiérrez Avendaño, and José Antonio Morales Ehrlich, Héctor Dada Hirezi, and José Ramón Ávalos Navarrete. The final junta, from 1980 to 1982, consisted of Colonel Gutiérrez Avendaño, Morales Ehrlich, Ávalos Navarrete, with José Napoleón Duarte as the junta's president.

The Revolutionary Government Junta was the source of many human rights violations that were committed across the country during its rule.

Background and coup 

The National Conciliation Party (PCN) ruled El Salvador from 1962 to 1979 as an effective one-party system. The PCN had diplomatic support from the United States and the CIA trained and funded the Salvadoran Armed Forces. The party maintained control of the country through fraudulent elections, political intimidation, and state-sponsored terrorism against civilians and leftist groups.

In March 1979, President Carlos Humberto Romero had soldiers crush protests and strikes against his government to prevent a revolution in El Salvador from starting, similar to the revolution in Nicaragua which began that year. The eventual overthrow of Nicaraguan President Anastasio Somoza Debayle in July 1979 prompted many military officers to remove Romero and replace him with a stronger government which was able to prevent such a revolution. The military gained the support of the US government and organized itself under Colonels Adolfo Arnoldo Majano Ramos and Jaime Abdul Gutiérrez Avendaño.

The military launched a coup d'état on 15 October 1979 and forced Romero to resign and go into exile. Many high-ranking military officials who were loyal to Romero, such as the Minister of National Defense and the Director of the National Guard, also resigned and went into exile. The coup is often cited as the beginning of the Salvadoran Civil War.

First Junta 

Three days after the coup on 18 October 1979, Colonels Majano Ramos and Gutiérrez Avendaño established the First Revolutionary Government Junta. It consisted of two military officers (Colonels Majano Ramos and Gutiérrez Avendaño) and three civilians; Guillermo Manuel Ungo Revelo, a democratic socialist politician from the National Revolutionary Movement (MNR), Mario Antonio Andino, the ex-vice president of the Chamber of Commerce and Industry of El Salvador (CCIES), and Román Mayorga Quirós, a rector of the Central American University.

The junta styled itself as a "reformist junta" which rose to power via a "reformist coup" lead by "reformist officers" in the military. The junta promised to redistribute wealth and implement several nation-wide reforms, including economic, political, and agrarian reforms. Promises to end human rights violations and political oppression were also made. The first reform put into place was the abolition of the National Democratic Organization (ORDEN), an organization composed of several right-wing paramilitaries that tortured political opponents, intimidated voters, rigged elections, and killed peasants. During the abolition of ORDEN, the paramilitaries themselves were not dissolved, however, and they operated independently and committed various atrocities during the civil war. The "reformist junta," meanwhile, utilized its own death squads to commit human rights violations during the civil war. Archbishop Óscar Arnulfo Romero y Galdámez cautiously endorsed the coup and the junta stating that the goals and reforms were good-willed.

The junta immediately faced problems from both the political right and left. In the weeks following the coup, thousands of civilians and members of the Unified Popular Action Front (FAPU), Popular Leagues "February 28" (LP-28), and People's Revolutionary Bloc (BRP), marched in the streets of San Salvador demanding the release of all the information on the victims of the military regime. They also demanded that the junta follow through with their promises of reform and also include wage increases, lower consumer prices, and public trials of military officers who had previously committed human rights abuses against the people. Meanwhile, wealthy landowners and businessmen, most of whom had affiliations with the National Association of Private Enterprise (ANEP), opposed the proposed reforms the junta promised to implement.

The leaders of the junta attempted to cater to the left to prevent an uprising by raising wages by 30% and attempting to implement agrarian reforms, however, the attempt failed. Meanwhile, the Army and National Guard continued to kill anyone suspected of being a leftist militant. By the end of October 1979, over 100 civilians had been killed by the Army and the National Guard, but the junta claimed that the acts were committed by forces that were not under its control.

From 2–5 January 1980, the three civilian members of the junta resigned. The entire cabinet, except the Minister of National Defense, Brigadier General José Guillermo García, also resigned. Colonels Majano Ramos and Gutiérrez Avendaño remained in place and organized the creation of a second junta.

Second Junta 

The Second Revolutionary Government Junta was formed on 9 January 1980. The second junta consisted, again, of two military officers (Colonels Majano Ramos and Gutiérrez Avendaño) and three civilians; José Ramón Ávalos Navarrete, an independent politician and a doctor, José Antonio Morales Ehrlich, a conservative member of the Christian Democratic Party (PDC), and Héctor Dada Hirezi, a progressive member of the PDC. Dada Hirezi resigned on 3 March 1980 after Mario Zamora, another progressive PDC politician, was assassinated by a far-right death squad. He was replaced by José Napoleón Duarte, another member of the PDC and former presidential candidate of the National Opposing Union (UNO) during the 1972 presidential election.

On the same day that the second junta formed, leftist groups created the Political Military Coordinating Committee (CPM) to combat the junta and the army. It was a coalition of the Popular Liberation Forces (FPL), Armed Forces of National Resistance (FARN), and the Communist Party of El Salvador (PCES). Two days later, the Revolutionary Coordinating Committee of the Masses (CRM) was created between the Unified Popular Action Front (FAPU), Popular Leagues "February 28" (LP-28), People's Revolutionary Bloc (BRP), and the Nationalist Democratic Union (UDN). The CRM had four goals: 1.) Overthrow the junta and end American imperialism, 2.) end the dominance of the oligarchy and nationalize land and industry, 3.) Assure democratic rights for the people, and 4.) Raise cultural standards, stimulate popular organizations, and create a new revolutionary armed forces.

On 22 January 1980, the 48th anniversary of La Matanza, the massacre of 10,000–40,000 indigenous and communist rebels by the government of President Maximiliano Hernández Martínez, around 80,000 to 200,000 people marched in the streets of San Salvador. According to the Salvadoran Human Rights Commission, the National Guard killed 67 people and injured 250. On 8 March 1980, the junta approved the new agrarian reforms and nationalized the national bank.

A death squad, acting under the orders of Major Roberto D'Aubuisson, assassinated Archbishop Romero while giving mass on 24 March. Around 250,000 people attended his funeral on 30 March and around 40 were killed by gunfire which is believed to have come from the National Guard. Colonel Majano Ramos, gave press statements stating that Interpol had the list of suspects in Romero's murder and that he would give that report to the judge assigned to the case, the Fourth Judge of Criminal Atilio Ramírez Amaya. The judge was nearly assassinated when armed men arrived to kill him at his residence. On 8 May, the army arrested D'Aubuisson during a meeting in which information allegedly related to the assassination of Romero was seized. An agenda of Captain Álvaro Saravia was seized under the name "Operation Pineapple." D'Aubuisson was not tried for the murder, nor for treason, despite him attempting to overthrow the junta on 30 April, and he was released from prison in May 1980. He later founded the Nationalist Republican Alliance (ARENA) in September 1981.

The Mass Revolutionary Coordinator joined the Salvadoran Democratic Front (FDS) to form the Revolutionary Democratic Front (FDR) at the University of El Salvador on 17 April. The Unified Revolutionary Directorate (DRU) was then formed on 22 May. The junta was concerned of the popularity and influence of the FDR and sent the army to university to disperse the group. Around 20 people were killed in the event.

On 10 October, the Farabundo Martí People's Forces of Liberation (FPL), Communist Party of El Salvador (PCES), National Resistance (RN), People's Revolutionary Army (ERP), and the Revolutionary Party of the Central American Workers – El Salvador (PRTC), joined forces to form the Farabundo Martí National Liberation Front (FMLN). The group was named after Augustín Farabundo Martí Rodríguez, the communist leader of the 1932 uprising.

Colonel Majano Ramos resigned as Chairman of the Junta and Commander-in-Chief of the Armed Forces on 14 May and gave the positions to Colonel Gutiérrez Avendaño, but he remained as a member of the junta. However, due to pressure from Colonel Gutiérrez Avendaño and the United States to step down, Colonel Majano Ramos resigned from the junta entirely on 13 December 1980, effectively ending the second junta. The junta then filed a warrant for the Colonel's arrest. He was arrested by army on 20 February 1981 on charges of military disobedience, released on 20 March, and left for exile in Panama.

Third Junta 

After the resignation of Majano Ramos on 13 December 1980, the Third Revolutionary Government Junta was formed. It consisted of the members of the previous junta: Colonel Gutiérrez Avendaño, Duarte, Morales Ehrlich, and Ávalos Navarrete. Duarte served as the President of the junta while Colonel Gutiérrez Avendaño served as Vice President. The third junta continued the implementation of the agrarian reforms and promised democratization. The United States, under President Ronald Reagan, continued economic aid and diplomatic support to the junta.

The FMLN launched the "Final Offensive" to overthrow the government and take control of the country on 10 January 1981. The junta contained the offensive, and by the end of January, the offensive ended in a strategic failure for the FMLN, but they did prove that they were a capable fighting force. The junta responded to the offensive by launching their own scorched-earth offensive in March 1981 in northern El Salvador.

On 17 March 1982, 4 Dutch journalists and 5 FMLN guerrillas were ambushed by the army near the town of El Paraíso, Chalatenango, with 8 being killed in the attack. The attack outraged many, especially in the Netherlands, where people demanded the removal of the junta from power. Duarte stated that it was not an attack but instead simply an accident and that the journalists were caught in the crossfire between army soldiers and FMLN guerrillas.

Democratization 

In order to democratize the country, the junta scheduled a legislative election for 28 March 1982 and a presidential election for 29 April 1982. The legislative election resulted in the Christian Democratic Party (PDC) gaining the most seats at 24. The Nationalist Republican Alliance (ARENA) gained 19, the National Conciliation Party (PCN) gained 14, and other minor parties gained the final 3 seats. During the presidential election, only members of the Constitutional Assembly were allowed to vote. The PDC, PCN, and minor Democratic Action (AD) joined in a coalition and elected Álvaro Alfredo Magaña Borja as president, defeating ARENA candidate, Hugo César Barrera, by a margin of 36 to 17 with 7 abstentions. D'Aubuisson accused Colonel Gutiérrez Avendaño of fixing the election in Magaña Borja's favor. Magaña Borja was inaugurated as President of El Salvador on 2 May 1982, the first civilian president since Arturo Araujo in 1931.

The assumption of Magaña Borja ended the rule of the Revolutionary Government Junta of El Salvador. Duarte continued to serve in politics and became President in 1984 while Colonel Gutiérrez Avendaño retired from military life.

Human rights violations 

From 1979 to 1982, the juntas committed various human rights violations and war crimes. Several deaths squads and paramilitaries were formed by junta soldiers and officers that attacked leftist militants and civilians. Because the death squads were made up of army soldiers and the United States was funding the army, the United States was indirectly funding the death squads as well.

The most notorious US-trained army battalion was the Atlácatl Battalion. The battalion committed two of the deadliest massacres during the civil war: the El Calabozo massacre and the El Mozote massacre. Meanwhile, the National Guard, the No. 1 Military Detachment, and paramilitaries that were formerly a part of ORDEN committed the Sumpul River massacre on the Honduran border.

See also 

1979 Salvadoran coup d'état
Right-wing paramilitarism in El Salvador
Salvadoran Civil War

References

External links 

El Salvador Civil War – Military Junta – Salvadoran Civil War – TV Eye – 1981

1979 in El Salvador
1980 in El Salvador
1981 in El Salvador
1982 in El Salvador
20th century in El Salvador
Cold War history by country
History of El Salvador
El Salvador
Salvadoran Civil War